Robert Kobliashvili (born 6 December 1993) is a Georgian Greco-Roman wrestler. He won a bronze medal at the 2017 World Wrestling Championships. He is a European Champion (2018). He competed in the men's Greco-Roman 85 kg event at the 2016 Summer Olympics, in which he was eliminated in the round of 16 by Denis Kudla.

He won one of the bronze medals in the 87 kg event at the 2022 European Wrestling Championships held in Budapest, Hungary. He competed in the 87kg event at the 2022 World Wrestling Championships held in Belgrade, Serbia.

References

1993 births
Living people
Male sport wrestlers from Georgia (country)
Olympic wrestlers of Georgia (country)
Wrestlers at the 2016 Summer Olympics
Wrestlers at the 2019 European Games
European Games competitors for Georgia (country)
World Wrestling Championships medalists
European Wrestling Championships medalists
20th-century people from Georgia (country)
21st-century people from Georgia (country)

3. https://web.archive.org/web/20200417132408/https://www.sports-reference.com/olympics/athletes/ko/roberti-kobliashvili-1.html

External links